Monty the Dog is a cartoon character created by British author Colin West. The character appeared in six books beginning in 1989, and was subsequently used as the basis for a television series. The series, consisting of 13 episodes, was produced by Ealing Animation and aired on BBC1 from 1994 to 1995.

Character
Monty is a pet dog owned by the Sprod family (Mr. and Mrs. Sprod and their children Simon and Josie). He wears his trademark red glasses which the Sprod family made for him following a suggestion from a cyclist who nearly hit him the day before. Monty still appears to be accident-prone, and he likes to eat sausages, chocolate biscuits, ice cream, custard, mince pies and Walnut Whips which often gets him into trouble.

Novels
The novels were published by A & C Black as part of the Jets series. They follow more or less the same format, the first book including the explanation of why Monty wears glasses. The story is told through text and black and white illustrations with an occasional speech bubble for the human characters, and a thought bubble for Monty's thoughts. The cover illustrations are in colour.

 Monty, the Dog who Wears Glasses (A&C Black, 1989)
Monty Bites Back (1990) (A&C Black, 1990)
 Published in the United States as Shape Up Monty! (Dutton Children's Books, 1991)
 Monty - up to his neck in trouble (A&C Black, 1991)
 Monty Must be Magic (A&C Black, 1992)
 Monty Ahoy! (A&C Black, 1994)
 Monty's Ups and Downs (Bloomsbury, 1996)

Television series
A television series made by Ealing Animation titled Monty based on the character was first broadcast on BBC1 in 1994 to 1995. Unlike the novels in which Monty's glasses do not have lenses it is implied that Monty is short sighted and has lenses in his glasses on television.

Episodes 

Monty's Picnic
Monty Goes to School
Monty and the Cat Next Door
Monty's Magic Trick
Monty Gets the Blame 
Monty at the Vets
Monty at the Library
Monty at the Supermarket
Monty at the Park
Monty at the School Fete
Monty Goes Missing
Monty Meets Bruiser
Monty and the Monsters

Credits
 From the Stories by: Colin West
 Writer: Jimmy Hibbert
 Narrator/Voices: Griff Rhys-Jones
 Animation: For Ealing; Neil Salmon, Kevin Baldwin, Malcolm Bourne
 Computer Operators: David Brylewski, Kieron Murtage, Cornelia van de Water, John McManus
 Layouts: David Elvin
 Backgrounds: Vivienne Redmond
 Producer for Ealing Animation: Richard Randolph
 Executive Producer: Theresa Plummer-Andrews
 Associate Producer: Helen Crossen
 Producer: Jill Green
 Director: David Lewis
 A Red Rooster Film & Television Entertainment Production for Children's International BBC and BBC Scotland.

References

External links
Author's website with Monty on the homepage
Information page about the Monty TV series from Toonhound

Characters in children's literature
Fictional dogs
Series of children's books
English-language television shows
BBC children's television shows
BBC Scotland television shows
British children's animated comedy television series
1994 British television series debuts
1995 British television series endings
1990s British animated television series
1990s British children's television series